Rachel Grace Pollack is an American science fiction author, comic book writer, and expert on divinatory tarot. She is involved in the women's spirituality movement.

Career

Tarot reading
Pollack has written Salvador Dali's Tarot, a book-length exposition of Salvador Dalí's Tarot deck, comprising a full-page color plate for each card, with her commentary on the facing page. Her work 78 Degrees of Wisdom on Tarot reading is commonly referenced by Tarot readers. She has created her own Tarot deck, Shining Woman Tarot (later Shining Tribe Tarot). She also aided in the creation of the Vertigo Tarot Deck with illustrator Dave McKean and author Neil Gaiman, and she wrote a book to accompany it.

Comics
Pollack, known for her run of issues 64–87 (1993–1995) on the comic book Doom Patrol, on DC Comics' Vertigo imprint, a continuation of a 1960s comic which had recently become a cult favorite under Grant Morrison. She took over the series in 1993 after meeting editor Tom Peyer at a party, telling him it was the only monthly comic book she would want to write at the time, and sending him a sample script. Towards the end of Morrison's run Pollack began writing monthly "letters to the editor" in what she describes as a "gee-whiz fangirl" voice asking to take over the book when Morrison was finished. In the final letter, she claims that she had already told her mother that she had been given the job. Peyer then used that response to that letter to officially announce that Pollack was, in fact, taking over the book. As a result of these letters being printed in the letter column of Doom Patrol issues, some people seem to believe that the letters are the way she actually got the job.

During her tenure, Pollack dealt with such rarely addressed comic-book topics as menstruation, sexual identity, and transsexuality. Her run ended two years later, with the book's cancellation.

In addition to Doom Patrol, Pollack has written issues of the Vertigo Visions anthology featuring Brother Power the Geek (1993) and Tomahawk (1998), the first 11 issues of the fourth volume of New Gods (1995), and the five-issue limited series Time Breakers (1996) for the short lived Helix imprint.

Author Neil Gaiman has sometimes consulted Pollack on the tarot for his stories.

In 2019, it was announced that Pollack was reuniting with Doom Patrol artist Richard Case and letterer John Workman to create a short story—titled "Snake Song"—for the Kickstarter funded "music-themed horror anthology" Dead Beats.

Fiction
Three of Pollack's novels have won or been nominated for major awards in the science fiction and fantasy field: Unquenchable Fire won the 1989 Arthur C. Clarke Award; Godmother Night won the 1997 World Fantasy Award, was shortlisted for the James Tiptree Jr. Award, and was nominated for a Lambda Literary Award for Transgender Literature; Temporary Agency was nominated for the 1995 Nebula Award and the Mythopoeic Award, and shortlisted for the Tiptree.

Her magical realism novels explore worlds imbued with elements pulled from a number of traditions, faiths, and religions. Several of her novels are set in an alternative reality that resembles modern America, but an America of Bright Beings, where magic and ritual, religion and thaumaturgy are the norms.

Nonfiction
Her book The Body of the Goddess is an exploration of the history of the Goddess. Pollack uses the image of the Goddess in many of her works.

Teaching
For 32 years, Pollack has been teaching seminars with Tarot author Mary K. Greer at the Omega Institute, in Rhinebeck, New York. She has also done seminars for several years in California in conjunction with Greer, and she co-presented a breakthrough seminar with Tarot author Johanna Gargiulo-Sherman on Tarot and psychic ability, using her own Shining Tribe Tarot and Gargulio-Sherman's Sacred Rose Tarot. Pollack is also a popular lecturer at Tarot seminars and symposiums such as LATS (Los Angeles Tarot Symposium), BATS (Bay Area Tarot Symposium), and the Readers Studio. She currently teaches creative writing at Goddard College. Her most recent work is included in the anthology called Interfictions: An Anthology of Interstitial Writing edited by Theodora Goss. She has taught English at State University of New York.

Influences
Pollack is Jewish, and has frequently written about the Kabbalah, most notably in The Kabbalah Tree.
 
She is a trans woman and has written frequently on transgender issues. In Doom Patrol she introduced Coagula, a transsexual character. She has also written several essays on transsexualism, attacking the notion that it is a "sickness", instead saying that it is a passion. She has emphasized the revelatory aspects of transsexualism, saying that "the  woman sacrifices her social identity as a male, her personal history, and finally the very shape of her body to a knowledge, a desire, which overpowers all rational understanding and proof."

A Secret Woman features a police detective who is transgender and Jewish. The detective utters the prayer, "Blessed art thou oh G-d who made me not a woman. Double blessed is Doctor Green who has." Rachel Pollack created the characters known as 'the bandage people' for her Doom Patrol run. The bandage people are 'sexually remaindered spirits' who died in sexual accidents. The initials srs came from the medical term 'sex reassignment surgery'. Rachel wrote the essay "The Transsexual Book of The Dead" for the anthology Phallus Palace. This article is concerning trans men.

Fairy tales such as the Brothers Grimm have influenced many of Pollack's writings. Her book Tarot of Perfection is a book of fairy tales based on the tarot.

Personal life 
In July 2022, Pollack revealed via Facebook that, after seemingly overcoming Hodgkin lymphoma several years earlier, she had been diagnosed with a different variant of lymphoma and would be undergoing chemotherapy. In August, Pollack's wife Zoe and Doom Patrol writer Patricia Nolan announced that Pollack was in an intensive care unit and started a GoFundMe fundraiser for her medical expenses. Those who shared the fundraiser on Twitter included Neil Gaiman, Shelly Bond, Gail Simone, and DC Comics editors Chris Conroy and Andrea Shay, while prominent donors included Rachel Gold, Al Ewing, Kieron Gillen, Kim Newman, Brett Booth, and Cliff Chiang, ultimately raising over $28,000 against a $15,000 goal by September.

On March 12, 2023, Gaiman announced via Mastodon, at the behest of Pollack's wife, that Pollack was in hospice care and nearing the end of her life. This led some outlets to mistakenly report that Pollack had already died.

Degrees, awards, and memberships
 1997 World Fantasy Award for Best Novel winner for Godmother Night
 1994 Nebula Award for Best Novel nominee for Temporary Agency
 1989 Arthur C. Clarke Award winner for Unquenchable Fire
 Certified Tarot Grand Master (CTGM) with the Tarot Certification Board of America
 Tarot Sage (TS) with the American Board For Tarot Certification
 member of the American Tarot Association (ATA)
 member of the International Tarot Society (ITS)
 member of the Tarot Guild of Australia
 member of the Tarot Association of the British Isles.
 Honours degree in English from New York University
 Masters in English from Claremont Graduate University
 Faculty, MFA in Creative Writing Program, Goddard College

Published works

Non-fiction books

Novels

Collections

Anthologies

Short fiction

Poetry

 The Wild Cows (1993)

Essays
"Introduction: A Machine for Constructing Stories" (1989)
 Read This (The New York Review of Science Fiction, October 1991) (1991)
 Read This (The New York Review of Science Fiction, July 1995) (1995)
 Read This (The New York Review of Science Fiction, August 1996) (1996)

Reviews
 The Book of Embraces (1991) by Eduardo Galeano
 Outside the Dog Museum (1992) by Jonathan Carroll
 Coelestis [vt Celestis](1996) by Paul Park

Comics

References

External links

Reviews of 78 Degrees of Wisdom
The story behind The Child Eater – Online Essay by Rachel Pollack at Upcoming4.me

20th-century American novelists
21st-century American novelists
American comics writers
American feminist writers
American science fiction writers
American women short story writers
American short story writers
American women novelists
Female comics writers
Jewish American writers
Jewish feminists
American lesbian writers
LGBT comics creators
LGBT Jews
LGBT people from New York (state)
Living people
Tarot readers
Transgender women
Transfeminists
American LGBT novelists
World Fantasy Award-winning writers
Claremont Graduate University alumni
Women science fiction and fantasy writers
20th-century American women writers
21st-century American women writers
Transgender Jews
Writers from Brooklyn
Weird fiction writers
21st-century American Jews
Transgender novelists
American transgender writers